Elphinstone railway station was located on the Bendigo line. It served the Victoria town of Elphinstone. The station closed to passenger traffic on 4 October 1981, as part of the New Deal timetable for country passengers.

All points, signals and the interlocked frame were abolished in 1988. The double line block sections Kyneton – Elphinstone and Elphinstone – Castlemaine "A" box were abolished, and replaced with double line block section Kyneton – Castlemaine "A" box.

The station building is now leased as a private residence.

References

External links
 Melway map at street-directory.com.au

Disused railway stations in Victoria (Australia)